The 1900 Tennessee Volunteers football team represented the University of Tennessee in the 1900 Southern Intercollegiate Athletic Association football season. Led by J. A. Pierce in second and final season as head coach, the Volunteers compiled an overall record of 3–2–1 with a mark of 0–2–1 in conference play. The first time in program history came against Vanderbilt on October 22, at Nashville.

Schedule

References

Tennessee
Tennessee Volunteers football seasons
Tennessee Volunteers football